This page provides a list of Telugu-language films produced in the year 2013.

Box office

Released films

January–June

July–December

Dubbed films

Notable deaths

References

2012
Telugu
Telugu